The 2021–22 season was FC Urartu's twenty-first consecutive season in the Armenian Premier League. Urartu will participate in the Armenian Premier League, Armenian Cup and the UEFA Europa Conference League.

Season events
On 17 June, Urartu announced the signing of Nana Antwi from Lori.

On 21 June, Urartu announced that Narek Aghasaryan, Sergey Mkrtchyan and Narek Grigoryan had all returned to the club following loan spells at BKMA Yerevan the previous season.

Urartu announced their second signing of the summer on 28 June, with Livio Milts joining the club from Roda JC Kerkrade.

On 30 July, Urartu announced the signing of Vardan Arzoyan from Shirak.

On 18 August, Urartu announced the signing of Armen Manucharyan after he'd left Aktobe in June.

On 17 November, Urartu announced that Arsen Petrosyan had returned to his role with the clubs youth teams, and that Robert Arzumanyan had been appointed as Acting Head Coach.

On 14 December, Urartu announced that Livio Milts had left the club by mutual consent.

On 17 February, Urartu announced the signing of Erik Vardanyan from Sochi.

On 17 February, Urartu announced the signing of Dmytro Khlyobas from Ordabasy.

Squad

Transfers

In

Loans in

Out

Loans out

Released

Friendlies

Competitions

Overall record

Premier League

Results summary

Results by round

Results

Table

Armenian Cup

Final

UEFA Europa Conference League

Qualifying rounds

Statistics

Appearances and goals

|-
|colspan="16"|Players away on loan:
|-
|colspan="16"|Players who left Urartu during the season:

|}

Goal scorers

Clean sheets

Disciplinary record

References

FC Urartu seasons
Urartu
Urartu